William Anthony Strange (born 1953) is a British Anglican priest. From 2009 to 2019, he was the Archdeacon of Cardigan, and the Vicar of Pencarreg and Llanycrwys in the Diocese of St David's, Church in Wales. He is an evangelical Anglican, and serves as vice-chair of the Evangelical Fellowship in the Church in Wales (EFCW).

References

1953 births
Living people
20th-century Welsh Anglican priests
21st-century Welsh Anglican priests
Archdeacons of Cardigan